Online learning may refer to study in home

 Educational technology, or e-learning
 E-learning (theory)
 Distance education
 Virtual school
 Online learning in higher education
 Massive open online courses
 Online machine learning, in computer science and statistics